Galagedara is a village in the Central Province of Sri Lanka. Galagedara is a beautiful Village in Kandy, Situated in the between two prominent cities. It is about 19 Km from Kandy and 23 Km from Kurunegala. Galagedara is situated in a Valley, and has the most scenic mountain views on the way, to Galagedara from Kandy. Galagedara has a huge rock named kobbagala, which takes almost 10 km to reach the top through a thick forest.

Proposed interchange of expressway of Galagedara was designed to be constructed.

References

Populated places in Kandy District